The Swiss Men's Volleyball Ligue 1 is a men's volleyball competition organized by the Swiss Volleyball Federation (Swiss Volley), it was created in 1957.

History 
In the 2020/21 championship, 8 teams played in the League A: Lindaren ( Amriswil ), Chenois Geneva ( Geneva ), Schönenwerd, Lausanne, Nefels, Yona, Basel, Lindaren ( Lucerne ). Champion title was won by "Chenoit Geneva", who won in the final series beating up "Lindaren" (Amriswil) 3-1 (3: 2, 0: 3, 3: 1, 3: 0). 3rd place was taken by "Schönenwerd".

Winners List

References

External links
 Swiss Volleyball
sports123.com
www.volleybox.net  

Switzerland
Sports leagues established in 1957
1957 establishments in Switzerland
Volleyball in Switzerland
Professional sports leagues in Switzerland